Victor Vran is an action role-playing video game developed by the Bulgarian independent development studio Haemimont Games. Victor Vran is published on Steam by EuroVideo Medien. It entered Steam Early Access in February 2015 and the final version was released in July 2015. The setting of the game resembles Gothic-fantasy fairy tale where both magic and science have a place in the world. The title exited early access on July 24, 2015. An updated port titled Victor Vran: Overkill Edition was released on PlayStation 4 and Xbox One on 6 June 2017, and a Nintendo Switch port was released on August 28, 2018. A version of the original game was made available for Amazon Luna on 20 October 2020.

Setting
The player assumes the role of Victor Vran, a demon hunter who arrives in the fantasy city of Zagoravia, to help its inhabitants fight off a demon infestation of unknown origin.

Gameplay
The combat of Victor Vran combines action RPG elements and reaction-based moves which allow the player to dodge attacks and avoid damage. The game features jump mechanic which is used in combat and in solving vertical puzzles and reaching secret map areas.

The hero - Victor Vran - has no specific character class. Players can tweak their character by changing freely different weapon classes, consumable items (e.g. potions or bombs) and spell-like demon powers. Destiny cards and hero outfits grant various passive abilities. Each weapon class offers one basic and two special attacks which can be combined for special bonuses and effects.

The game world is divided in large areas representing the districts and the surroundings of the city of Zagoravia and adjacent dungeons. Each area has 5 specific challenges which grant various rewards upon completion. The player can tweak the difficulty on every area and dungeon by using special Hex items which grant buffs and bonuses to the enemies within.

Victor Vran features cooperative multiplayer.

Additional content
During Gamescom 2014 it was announced that a Motörhead expansion for Victor Vran is being developed. The first DLC pack entitled Motörhead Through the Ages was released on 6 June 2017, along with another DLC pack entitled Fractured Worlds.

Reception
Victor Vran received generally positive reviews from critics upon release. Aggregate review website Metacritic assigned a score of 75/100 based on 42 reviews for Windows, and 77/100 for Xbox One based on 4 critic reviews.

Notes

References

External links
 Official Website
 Official Wiki

2015 video games
Action role-playing video games
Dark fantasy role-playing video games
Fantasy video games
Linux games
MacOS games
Multiplayer and single-player video games
Role-playing video games
Video games about demons
Video games developed in Bulgaria
Nintendo Switch games
PlayStation 4 games
Windows games
Xbox One games
Early access video games
PlayStation 4 Pro enhanced games
Wired Productions games